Léon Marc Herminie Fairmaire (29 June 1820 – 1 April 1906) was a French entomologist.

A specialist in Coleoptera he assembled an immense collection comparable with that of Pierre François Marie Auguste Dejean (1780-1845). This is in the Muséum national d'histoire naturelle. Fairmaire wrote 450 scientific papers and other publications relating to Coleoptera (partial list of papers in Wikispecies). He also worked on Hemiptera.

External links
 
Scarab Workers
BDH Histoire Naturelle de France Hemipteres Musée Scolaire Deyrolle (1884).Scan

1820 births
1906 deaths
French entomologists
Presidents of the Société entomologique de France
Coleopterists